Keffel Resende Alvim (born 27 September 1999), commonly known as Keffel, is a Brazilian footballer who plays as a midfielder for Portuguese club Torreense.

Career
On 14 July 2022, Keffel signed with Liga Portugal 2 club Torreense.

Career statistics

Club

Notes

References

1999 births
Living people
Brazilian footballers
Association football midfielders
Figueirense FC players
Associação Desportiva São Caetano players
Retrô Futebol Clube Brasil players
C.D. Trofense players
S.C.U. Torreense players
Campeonato Pernambucano players
Campeonato de Portugal (league) players
Liga Portugal 2 players
Brazilian expatriate footballers
Expatriate footballers in Portugal
Brazilian expatriate sportspeople in Portugal